Peter Judd may refer to:

 Peter A. Judd, Latter Day Saint writer and religious leader
 Peter Judd (cricketer) (born 1938), former English cricketer
 Peter Judd (priest) (born 1949), retired Dean of Chelmsford